During the 2004–05 Dutch football season, Feyenoord competed in the Eredivisie.

Season summary
Feyenoord were the Eredivisie's top scorers but they did not improve on last's seasons results and finished 4th, way off challenging for the title. The club made it to the semi-finals in the domestic KNVB cup, losing to the winner of the KNVB Cup PSV Eindhoven after penalties. In the UEFA cup they made it to the 3rd round (last 32 clubs) losing to the later finalist Sporting CP from Portugal.

Kits
Feyenoord's kits were manufactured by Italian company Kappa and sponsored by Belgian financial company Fortis.

Squad
Squad at end of season
In brackets where they came from.

Left club during season

Left club at the end of previous season

Results

Eredivisie

KNVB Cup

UEFA Cup

Friendlies

References

Notes

Feyenoord seasons
Feyenoord